Mirtha Quintanales is a Cuban lesbian feminist, writer, and a professor at New Jersey City University. Her short writing piece "I come with no Illusions" was featured in the feminist anthology This Bridge Called My Back.

Early life 
Born in Cuba in 1948, Mirtha Natacha Quintanales immigrated to the United States from Cuba at the age of 13 on April 2, 1962.

Bibliography 
 This Bridge Called My Back (1981)
 Telling to Live (2001)

References

Lesbian feminists
Cuban non-fiction writers
Cuban women writers
Cuban lesbian writers